Lee Chun-yi (born 6 July 1965) is a Taiwanese politician who was elected to the Legislative Yuan as a representative of Chiayi district in 2012. He is a member of the Democratic Progressive Party.

Political career
Lee was deputy mayor of Chiayi between 2001 and 2004, when he left office to be appointed the vice minister of civil service. In 2005, he challenged Chen Li-chen in a mayoral primary, and lost. Lee contested the Chiayi district legislative seat in 2012, defeating incumbent Chiang Yi-hsiung. Lee was elected co-convenor of the Internal Administration Committee alongside Wu Yu-sheng in 2014. The pair succeeded , who had, by forcibly passing the Cross-Strait Service Trade Agreement through the committee earlier that year, inadvertently caused the Sunflower Student Movement. Lee supported the creation of a committee to consider constitutional amendments in December. Lee won reelection in 2016. After stepping down at the end of his legislative term in 2020, Lee served as deputy secretary-general of the presidential office. In June 2022, Lee received the DPP nomination for the Chiayi mayoralty.

References

1965 births
Living people
Chiayi City Members of the Legislative Yuan
Democratic Progressive Party Members of the Legislative Yuan
Members of the 8th Legislative Yuan
Members of the 9th Legislative Yuan
Deputy mayors of Chiayi City